Adam LaMarque Jones (born August 1, 1985) is an American former professional baseball outfielder. He played in Major League Baseball (MLB) for the Seattle Mariners, Baltimore Orioles and Arizona Diamondbacks and in Nippon Professional Baseball (NPB) for the Orix Buffaloes.

The Mariners selected Jones in the first round of the 2003 MLB draft. He came up in the Mariners' minor league system as a shortstop before transitioning to the outfield. He made his MLB debut with the Mariners in 2006 and was traded to the Orioles before the 2008 season. Jones is a five-time MLB All-Star, a four-time Gold Glove Award winner, and a Silver Slugger winner.

Early life
Adam Jones was born in San Diego, California on August 1, 1985, the son of Andrea, who raised Jones and his older brother alone until he was five. Growing up in San Diego, he was a San Diego Padres fan and was a huge fan of Tony Gwynn. Jones excelled at both football and basketball and did not pick up a baseball bat until he was twelve. In 1997 his stepfather, Kenneth, took him to a Padres game after which he started to gain an interest in the sport. He picked up the sport very quickly and went on to star on his high school team. Jones graduated from Morse High School in 2003 after leading his high school team as both a pitcher and a shortstop.  During his senior season he batted .406, hit four home runs and batted in 27 runs. On the mound, Jones posted a record of three wins and three losses, while posting a 2.71 ERA. At Morse, Jones was a teammate of future Baltimore Orioles teammate Quintin Berry. Jones initially committed to play college baseball at San Diego State for head coach Tony Gwynn.

Professional career

Seattle Mariners
Jones was selected by the Seattle Mariners with the 37th pick in the first round of the 2003 MLB draft as a shortstop/right-handed pitcher. Most experts believed Seattle wanted to use him as a pitcher, but Jones said he would prefer to play every day and was made the shortstop of the Mariners' rookie league affiliate. A few years later when the Mariners acquired Yuniesky Betancourt, they asked Jones if he would move to the outfield and he agreed.

2006–07
Jones' MLB career began when he was called up to the Mariners from the Tacoma Rainiers on July 14, 2006. He replaced corner outfielder Shin-Soo Choo whose attempt to fill in for injured starting center fielder Jeremy Reed was less than successful. Jones made his major-league debut that night, going 0-for-3 with a fourth-inning walk in a 5–3 victory over the Toronto Blue Jays at Rogers Centre. After going hitless in his first twelve at bats, he got his first major league hit when he singled off Sidney Ponson in the seventh of an 11-inning 5–4 defeat to the New York Yankees at Yankee Stadium four nights later on July 18. Jones hit his first home run in the majors off Adam Eaton in the third inning of an 8–2 loss to the Texas Rangers at Ameriquest Field in Arlington on August 10, 2006.

On August 3, 2007, Jones returned to the MLB for the first time that season, starting in right field against the Boston Red Sox. He went 2-for-4 and scored two runs in the 7–4 victory.

Baltimore Orioles
On February 8, 2008, Jones was traded to the Baltimore Orioles along with left-handed reliever George Sherrill and minor league pitchers Kam Mickolio, Chris Tillman, and Tony Butler for the left-handed starting pitcher Érik Bédard.

2008
On July 28, 2008, Jones became the second player ever to hit a triple and a grand slam in the same game as a visitor to Yankee Stadium (the first was Pat Seerey in 1945). On September 21, 2008, Jones hit the final triple at Yankee Stadium in the second inning off Andy Pettitte and later scored the first run of the game.

Jones finished his first season with the Orioles batting .270 to go along with nine home runs, 57 RBI and 10 stolen bases in 132 games. He was tied for 11th in the major leagues with seven triples.

2009
After a strong start to the season, Jones was selected to represent Baltimore in the 2009 All Star Game on July 5. In the game, he drove in Curtis Granderson on a sacrifice fly for the winning run in the American League's 4–3 victory.

The second half wasn't as kind to Jones though and in August, he sprained his left ankle and missed the end of the 2009 season. He finished the season with a .277 batting average, 19 homers, 70 RBI and 10 stolen bases in 119 games. He tied for fifth among major league center fielders with nine outfield assists.

In November, he was awarded a Gold Glove for his defensive play.

2010
Jones finished his third season in Baltimore with a .284 batting average, 19 homers, 69 RBI and seven stolen bases in 149 games. He led all center fielders and was second in the majors in outfield assists with 12.

His home runs included an inside-the-park home run on May 22, 2010, when center fielder Nyjer Morgan, apparently not realizing the ball was still on the playing field, threw his glove down in disgust.

2011
As of August, Jones was having the best statistical season of his career. On August 6, in a game against the Toronto Blue Jays, he hit his then career high 20th home run of the season.

In 2011, Jones led the major leagues in sacrifice flies, with 12, and led all AL outfielders in errors, with 8.

2012

Jones started the 2012 season hitting .310 with 14 home runs and 31 runs batted in through the Orioles' first 46 games. His stellar play led to the Orioles signing him to a six-year contract extension worth $85.5 million on May 26. Escalators could raise that total to $91.5 million over the same period. The contract surpassed the previous contracts of Miguel Tejada and Nick Markakis as the largest in Orioles' history and makes Jones the second highest paid center fielder in Major League Baseball, behind the Dodgers' Matt Kemp. Jones hit the second walk-off home run of his career on June 9, a two-run home run in the bottom of the 12th inning that resulted in a 6–4 victory for the Orioles over the Philadelphia Phillies.

On July 1, Jones was selected to be one of the Orioles representatives in the 2012 All Star Game.

Jones hit the 100th home run of his career on August 28 against the Chicago White Sox. Two days later, he established a new career high by hitting his 26th home run of the season, also against the White Sox. Jones played in all 162 games in 2012, batting .287 with 32 home runs and 82 RBI.

On September 30, 2012, Jones was named the Most Valuable Oriole for the second consecutive season. The Orioles made the playoffs as a wild card against the Texas Rangers. In the 2012 American League Wild Card Game, Jones hit a sacrifice fly to score a run in the Orioles' 5–1 win. The Orioles would later lose in five games to the New York Yankees in the 2012 American League Division Series.

2013

Prior to the start of the 2013 season, Jones was selected by the United States national baseball team to participate in the 2013 World Baseball Classic. He appeared in his third All-Star Game, his first as a starter.

Jones finished a strong 2013 season batting .285 with 33 home runs and 108 RBI, both of which were new career highs. He did, however, draw only 25 walks and finished with a .318 on-base percentage, his lowest since 2008. On August 11, 2013, at a game at AT&T Park in San Francisco, a fan threw a banana towards him in the outfield, Jones reported via Twitter.

After the Orioles failed to make the 2013 playoffs, Jones decided to join MLB Network as an extra analyst for the duration of the postseason.

2014
On April 13, Jones recorded his 1,000th career hit off Mark Buehrle in a game versus the Toronto Blue Jays. In a game against the Houston Astros at Camden Yards on May 11, 2014, he singled with the bases loaded and drove in his 500th and 501st RBIs. Jones participated in the 2014 MLB All-Star Game. After the season ended, he traveled to Japan to join a team of MLB All-Stars playing against All-Stars of Nippon Professional Baseball in the 2014 Major League Baseball Japan All-Star Series. The Orioles went on to win the 2014 American League Division Series in a three-game sweep of the Detroit Tigers, and later lost in a four-game sweep in the 2014 American League Championship Series to the Kansas City Royals.

2015
In 2015, Jones was elected to his fifth All-Star Game, his fourth in a row. He was originally voted in as a reserve, however, an injury to Kansas City Royals outfielder Alex Gordon allowed Jones to replace Gordon as a starting outfielder. During the Orioles' final game before the All-Star break, Jones hit two home runs in a game against the Washington Nationals, raising his career total with the Orioles to 180. His second home run moved him into eighth on the Orioles all-time home runs list, and it was his seventh career multi-home run game. On July 30, Jones hit the 182nd home run of his Orioles career, which tied him for seventh on the team's all-time list with Ken Singleton. The very next night, Jones hit a three-run home run, giving him sole possession of seventh place on the all-time Orioles home run list. It was also his one hundredth career home run at OPACY. On August 16, Jones went 3-for-4 and hit two home runs in an 18–2 rout of the Oakland Athletics. It was Jones' eighth career multi-home run game.

Jones played in 137 games in 2015, his lowest total since 2009. He hit a career-low .269 with 27 home runs and 82 RBI. The Orioles finished the season with a record of 81–81.

2016
Jones started the 2016 season batting second in the starting lineup. He went 1-for-5 with an RBI in the season opener, in a 3–2 win over the Minnesota Twins. On April 6, Jones injured himself during an at-bat late in the game. He sat out for the next four days, before returning on April 11 as a defensive replacement. He wouldn't start again until April 14. Jones hit .224 in April after collecting 15 hits in 67 at-bats. He only hit one home run while driving in seven runs.

After going 1-for-5 in a victory over the Athletics on May 8, Jones' average dipped to .200. He later tweeted "Gonna figure it allllll out. Part of the grind. #StayHungry" that day. Over the next week, Jones collected 13 hits, four home runs, nine RBIs, hit .520, and had two game-winning hits (two-run single & solo homerun). 
On May 13, Jones hit his 200th career home run in a game against the Detroit Tigers. On June 2, the Orioles hit a season-high seven home runs in a game against the Red Sox, two of which belonged to Jones. The second one (in the eighth inning) was his 200th career home run in an Orioles uniform. In addition, his first homer came from the leadoff spot, giving him a home run in each spot in the lineup. On July 8, Jones passed Brady Anderson for sole possession of sixth place on the Orioles all-time home run list with 210.

Jones finished 2016 slashing .265/.310/.436 with an OPS of .746. He hit 29 home runs while driving in 83 runs. He swung at 44.8% of pitches outside the strike zone (the highest percentage in the majors), and swung at 60.6% of all pitches he saw, tops in the major leagues. Jones would go 1-for-5 with a run scored in the Orioles Wild Card Game loss.

2017
During the second game of the season, Jones hit his 223rd career home run as an Oriole, tying him for fifth all-time in franchise history with Rafael Palmeiro. Jones would pass Palmeiro five games later with his second home run of the season and 224th in an Orioles uniform. While at Fenway Park on May 1, Jones witnessed a Red Sox fan throw peanuts at him while running into the dugout at the end of an inning and another fan(s) who used a barrage of racial slurs directed at Jones. The next day, on May 2, Jones received a welcoming ovation while playing the next game at Fenway. On May 3, Jones was ejected for the first time in his career, by the home plate umpire, Sam Holbrook, for arguing balls and strikes. On May 10, Jones recorded his 745th career RBI as an Oriole, surpassing Brady Anderson for sixth most all-time in franchise history. On May 21, Jones hit his 124th career home run at Camden Yards, tying him with Rafael Palmeiro for most home runs in ballpark history. The following night, Jones passed Palmeiro with a three-run homer in the second inning, giving him sole possession of first place on top of Camden Yards' home run leaderboard. Jones was also first all-time in extra-base hits and RBIs at Camden Yards. On August 28, Jones hit the 250th home run of his career.

On September 1, Jones was ejected in the first inning of a game against the Blue Jays, after expressing his displeasure with a strike call. It was the second ejection of his career, the first coming earlier in the year.

2018
During opening day against the Minnesota Twins on March 29, 2018, Jones hit a walk-off home run as the Orioles won 3–2. On April 5, Jones drove in two runs, moving him past Ken Williams for sixth-most RBIs in franchise history. Then, on April 26, Jones tied Boog Powell for sixth-most extra-base hits in franchise history with 557.

On August 10, Jones made his first start as a right fielder in an Orioles uniform after playing 1,555 in center for the O's. This allowed Cedric Mullins to take over the position. He ranked first in franchise history in games started and innings played in center and ranked second in games, putouts, assists and Gold Gloves won. Jones' 259 career home runs as a centerfielder ranked 13th most in MLB history. During the game, he collected a stolen base, the 86th of his Orioles career, moving him into 10th place all-time in Orioles history.

Despite a drop in his power numbers, Jones put up a solid .281/.313/.419 slash line with 15 home runs (the first time he failed to reach 20 since 2010), 63 RBI, 35 doubles and seven steals in 145 games. He became a free agent at the conclusion of the season.

Jones finished his Orioles career with the following ranks in the franchise's history: 875 runs scored (seventh), 1,781 hits (fifth), 305 doubles (eighth), 263 home runs (fifth), 866 RBI (sixth), 595 extra-base hits (fifth). He added five All-Star game appearances, four Gold Gloves and one Silver Slugger during his 11-year tenure.

Arizona Diamondbacks

On March 11, 2019, Jones signed a one-year, $3 million contract with the Arizona Diamondbacks.

In 2019, Jones batted .260/.313/.414 with 16 home runs and 67 RBI in 137 games for Arizona. On defense in 2019, he had the lowest fielding percentage of all major league right fielders (.972).

Orix Buffaloes
On December 10, 2019, Jones signed with the Orix Buffaloes of Nippon Professional Baseball on a two-year contract worth $8 million.

On June 19, 2020, Jones made his NPB debut. During the course of the season, Jones slashed .258/.331/.417 and collected 78 hits, 12 doubles and 12 home runs, drove in 43 runs while scoring 29 and stole one base in 87 games.

On November 25, 2021, Jones became known as "Mr. Thanksgiving" for his game-winning home run ("Turkey Shot") in the top of the ninth inning in Game 5 of the 2021 Japan Series on the American Thanksgiving holiday to help Orix stave off elimination.

Orix opted not to exercise a team option for 2022. Jones subsequently retired.

International career
Jones played for Team USA in the 2013 World Baseball Classic and 2017 World Baseball Classic.

In the 2017 WBC opening round of group play, Jones helped the USA advance to the second round by recording a walk-off hit vs. Colombia. In the second round, in a game against the Dominican Republic, Jones made a home-run-saving catch that helped propel Team USA into the semifinals. The team went on to win the 2017 Classic against Puerto Rico. Jones was later quoted as saying, "To do it with those guys, it was probably the best experience of my life so far, especially with sports," and was extremely glad to have had the experience.

To go along with his solid defensive showcase, Jones slashed .200/.243/.429 and hit two doubles, two home runs and drove in five runs. In addition, Jones hit a walk off single in the US' first game of the tournament against Colombia. Jones also hit a game-tying solo home run against Venezuela in the eighth inning of the US' Pool F game, sparking a rally that led the team to a 4–2 victory.

Personal life
On May 29, 2010, Jones was mistakenly detained at the Canadian border while he was trying to get to Toronto. He believed it was a case of mistaken identity; however, he would not disclose whether he was mistaken for Cincinnati Bengals cornerback Adam "Pacman" Jones, who has had numerous brushes with the law.

Jones married Audie Fugett, the only daughter of Jean Fugett, in late December 2014. They had their first son in March 2014. Jones was the best man at Quintin Berry's wedding and also the godfather to his son, Kameron.

Being a San Diego native, Jones is a season ticket holder for the San Diego Gulls of the American Hockey League and has even worked as an off ice referee for the team. Jones remains a Padres fan during and after his career and has been following the team and former teammate Machado during their 2022 playoff run.

Jones has four tattoos. One of his mother and another of his grandmother, who he calls "the two most important women in my life", on his left shoulder. Whenever crossing the plate after hitting a home run, he would tap his left shoulder as a tribute.

While playing in Japan, Jones started a podcast called Heckle Deez with brother-in-law Reginald Fugett. He and Fugett brought on guests from the baseball community in both the U.S. and Japan, including Wladimir Balentien and C.C. Sabathia. The podcast released 36 episodes in 2020 and 2021 and was relaunched by The Baltimore Banner in 2022 as The Adam Jones Podcast. Jones co-hosts the podcast with Baltimore radio personality Jerry Coleman, with Fugett appearing as a moderator of debates between the two.

References

External links

1985 births
Living people
American expatriate baseball players in Japan
Arizona Diamondbacks players
Arizona League Mariners players
African-American baseball players
American League All-Stars
Baltimore Orioles players
Baseball players from San Diego
Cardenales de Lara players
American expatriate baseball players in Venezuela
Everett AquaSox players
Gold Glove Award winners
Inland Empire 66ers of San Bernardino players
Major League Baseball center fielders
Major League Baseball right fielders
Nippon Professional Baseball designated hitters
Nippon Professional Baseball outfielders
Orix Buffaloes players
Peoria Javelinas players
San Antonio Missions players
Seattle Mariners players
Silver Slugger Award winners
Tacoma Rainiers players
Wisconsin Timber Rattlers players
World Baseball Classic players of the United States
2013 World Baseball Classic players
2017 World Baseball Classic players
21st-century African-American sportspeople
20th-century African-American people